Maurizio Enzo Lupi (born 3 October 1959) is an Italian politician. He served as minister of infrastructure and transport between 28 April 2013 and 20 March 2015.

Early life and education
Lupi was born in Milan, Italy, on 3 October 1959. He has a degree in political science at Università Cattolica del Sacro Cuore.

Career
Lupi served as a member of the municipal council of Milan from 1993 to 1997 and until 1996 he was vice president of the council. He has been a member of the Italian parliament since the XIV legislative period or 2001.

He served as deputy house speaker until 28 April 2013 when he was appointed minister of infrastructure and transport in the Letta cabinet. He replaced Corrado Passera in the post. Lupi joined the New Centre-Right formed by Angelino Alfano in November 2013. Lupi continued to serve as the minister of infrastructure and transport in the cabinet formed by Matteo Renzi in February 2014.

Resignation 
On 19 March 2015 Lupi announced that he would step down as minister on the following day due to a scandal involving public works on infrastructure in which his name was cited several times. His tenure as infrastructure and transport minister ended next day when he resigned from the post, and Prime Minister Matteo Renzi accepted it.

Personal life and views
Lupi is married and has three children.

In the Letta cabinet, Lupi was one of two members of the Catholic movement Communion and Liberation. He is a strong supporter of the TAV project that would connect Italy and France via high-speed rail.

References

External links

1959 births
Living people
Politicians from Milan
Italian Roman Catholics
Christian Democracy (Italy) politicians
Forza Italia politicians
The People of Freedom politicians
New Centre-Right politicians
Popular Alternative politicians
Transport ministers of Italy
Deputies of Legislature XIV of Italy
Deputies of Legislature XV of Italy
Deputies of Legislature XVI of Italy
Deputies of Legislature XVII of Italy
Deputies of Legislature XVIII of Italy
Letta Cabinet
Renzi Cabinet
Communion and Liberation
Università Cattolica del Sacro Cuore alumni